Glyphipterix lamprosema is a species of sedge moth in the genus Glyphipterix. It was described by Alfred Jefferis Turner in 1926. It is found in Australia, including New South Wales.

References

Moths described in 1926
Glyphipterigidae
Moths of Australia